The Venus Hunters is a collection of short stories by British writer J. G. Ballard, first published in 1980 as a paperback by Panther Books, and reprinted as a hardback in 1986 by Victor Gollancz. It includes:

 "Now: Zero"
 "The Time-Tombs"
 "Track 12"
 "Passport to Eternity"
 "Escapement"
 "Time of Passage"
 "The Venus Hunters"
 "The Killing Ground"
 "One Afternoon at Utah Beach"
 "The 60 Minute Zoom"

The first seven stories are reprinted from The Overloaded Man; the other three are more recent.

References

External links

The Terminal Collection: JG Ballard First Editions

1980 short story collections
Short story collections by J. G. Ballard
Panther Books books